Luc-sur-Orbieu (literally Luc on Orbieu) is a commune in the Aude department in southern France.

Geography
The village lies on the right bank of the Orbieu, which forms most of the commune's western border, then flows east through the northern part of the commune.

Population

See also
 Corbières AOC
 Communes of the Aude department

References

Communes of Aude
Aude communes articles needing translation from French Wikipedia